A vehicle start-stop system or stop-start system automatically shuts down and restarts the internal combustion engine to reduce the amount of time the engine spends idling, thereby reducing fuel consumption and emissions.  This is most advantageous for vehicles which spend significant amounts of time waiting at traffic lights or frequently come to a stop in traffic jams. Start-stop technology may become more common with more stringent government fuel economy and emissions regulations. This feature is present in hybrid electric vehicles, but has also appeared in vehicles which lack a hybrid electric powertrain. For non-electric vehicles fuel economy gains from this technology are typically in the range of 3–10%, potentially as high as 12%. In the United States, idling wastes approximately 14.8 billion liters (3.9 billion U.S. gallons; 3.3 billion Imperial gallons) of gasoline per year.

On a manual transmission vehicle, stop-start is activated by stopping the car, changing gear to neutral, and releasing the clutch. The engine will not stop if the car is moving, even if the aforementioned steps are followed (this is not true for all cars). The engine restarts when the clutch is pressed prior to selecting a gear to move the car. The engine may also restart if there is a demand for power from, for example, the air conditioning system.

Since automobile accessories like compressors and water pumps have typically been designed to run on a serpentine belt on the engine, those systems must be redesigned to function properly when the engine is turned off. Typically, an electric motor is used to power these devices instead.  On vehicles where the AC compressor still runs from the drive belt, some drivers turn on the AC as an improvised way to disable start stop.

This technology has also been used on Honda scooters in Asian markets for the last decade. Their PCX 125 cc model was released in 2010 to be sold in Europe with this technology, though their North American model does not feature it.

Characteristics 
Start/stop technology came to Europe first, due to regulatory differences. 25 percent of the New European Driving Cycle (NEDC) is spent idling. In comparison, only an estimated 11 percent of the United States United States Environmental Protection Agency (EPA) test is spent at idle. Start/stop activation depends on specific driver inputs as well as operating conditions. The engine must have reached proper temperature to get adequate light-off of its catalytic converter and also to ensure proper lubrication and as effortless a restart as possible.

With a manual-gearbox car, engine shutdown typically comes with braking to a complete stop, gearbox in neutral and clutch release. Cars with automatic transmissions shut down upon braking to a full stop - the shut down is activated by the foot brake pedal being in use when the car comes to a halt. If the car is slowed initially by manual use of the automatic gear box and final stoppage is by use of the handbrake the engine will not shut down.

Enhanced components 
The system needs to be implemented in conjunction with modifications and reinforcements on many of the car's components in order to reinforce the engine and electrical system durability and long-term wear resistance, due to the increased loads that the added stopping and starting cycles impose. To accomplish similar levels of durability, comfort and user experience to that of older cars without the system, the car's manufacturer can include one or more of the following enhancements in the car's industrial design:

 The engine main (crankshaft) bearings are coated with special polymers that have properties of dry lubricants, such as polyamide. This aids the lack of the motor oil film and hydrodynamic lubrication when the crankshaft stops, preventing metal-to-metal contact that would otherwise produce accelerated wear on the bearing surfaces.
 The main battery is either absorbent glass mat (AGM) or enhanced flooded battery (EFB) technology, both supporting an increased number of charging cycles and increased load. This is important because all the car's electrical system must be maintained by the battery after the alternator stops generating current.
 The starter is reinforced and designed to withstand continuous use without wearing too fast or overheating.
 An independent cooling circuit is added in conjunction with an electrical runoff water pump that keeps on running when the main mechanical pump goes out. This ensures the coolant supply to heat sensitive engine components like turbocharger bearings and to keep cabin temperature in wintertime. 
 Special sensors and engine control units (ECUs) can be added to ensure proper system running conditions, and to keep parameters between tolerance like a good battery charge, essential to guarantee future starts.

History
Carbon monoxide emissions and the fuel shortage/oil crisis of the 1970s pushed car manufacturers to find solutions to reduce gas consumption. The first vehicle to use the automatic on/off switch was the six-cylinder Toyota Crown in 1974 and was already claiming a 10% gas saving in traffic. In the 1980s, the Fiat Regata "ES" with the City-matic system and Volkswagen Polo "Formel E" also used similar devices. The Volkswagen Group also adopted it in the Golf Ecomatic in 1994 and in the Volkswagen Lupo "3L" and the Audi A2 "3L" in 1999. Though these early implementations were considered rather disconcerting by many drivers, and high pricing failed to yield these cars much commercial success, both the Volkswagen Lupo and the Audi A2 (in their "3 litre" leverage) were more efficient than any production car available in the US at the time of their release.

Since European emission standard Euro 5, more and more vehicles include a start-stop system, whatever the price level, as reducing idling also reduces vehicles' emissions of CO², a prime cause of global warming.

Manufacturers continued to refine the system. In 2010, Valeo declared its second Start-Stop generation would appear in the same year. This new generation is called "i-StARS".The Valeo system is included in Citroën, Land Rover, Peugeot, Smart, and Volvo, while the Bosch system is included in Fiat, Nissan, SEAT, and Volkswagen, with various motorization including essence and diesel. Bosch developed a system for automatic cars.

The Mazda Smart Idle Stop System (SISS) uses combustion start instead of electrical start. By sensing the position of the pistons in the cylinders, the engine is stopped in a configuration that allows immediate starting by combustion. They claim quieter and quicker engine restart within 0.35 seconds.

The Kia ISG EcoDynamics system uses Bosch, Valeo and Varta components.

Manufacturers

Alexander Dennis 
Some Alexander Dennis Enviro200 MMC and Enviro400 MMC buses are equipped with stop/start systems that will stop the engine at bus stops.

Bentley
Stop-Start technology was fitted to a Bentley for the first time in 2016 on the Bentayga model. Bentley's system stops the engine when the car is stopped or moving slowly.

BMW
BMW is including the technology across many of its cars and the MINI line for 2008 as part of its Efficient Dynamics brand. BMW has been interested in ways to reduce parasitic losses on engines, so the company took the technology a step further. Instead of using an Integrated Starter Generator (ISG), BMW has used an enhanced starter which is a conventional starter, developed by Robert Bosch GmbH, that can withstand the increased number of engine-starts in a stop-start vehicle.

BMW has developed the system such that the alternator is not activated most of the time. This means that electrical components in the vehicle are normally running on battery power. When the battery needs to be charged or when decelerating or braking, the alternator is activated to recharge the battery (regenerative braking). Since this battery experiences very different load characteristics than a normal car battery, BMW used an absorptive glass mat (AGM) type instead.

Due to the use of regenerative braking, some have started calling this type of system a micro hybrid, a step below a mild hybrid system where the ISG can be used to assist the engine or even drive the vehicle.

Citroën

Citroën introduced a more refined system in its C2 and C3 models by 2006, named "Stop and Start". The Citroën implementation combines a SensoDrive automated gearbox and an electronically controlled reversible alternator or integrated starter-generator (ISG). An ISG, also known as "integrated starter-alternator", combines the role of the starter and alternator into one unit;
manufacturers include Valeo
and Denso.

Fiat Chrysler Automobiles

FCA introduced the Robert Bosch GmbH made system in the end of 2008 in the Fiat 500. Starting September 2009, Alfa Romeo also introduced this system in its Alfa Romeo Mito series utilising Fiat Powertrain Technologies (FPT) 1.4 L Turbo petrol MultiAir engines.

Ford

Late in 2010, Ford announced that its start-stop system, already used in its hybrids as well as several mainstream models in Europe, would be introduced in North America with the 2012 models, initially with 4-cylinder engines and later proliferating into V6s and V8s.  Eventually the system will be available in all Ford vehicles.

In 2013, it announced that start-stop technology would be brought into the second generation Ford Fusion models, and it built start-stop systems into the Ford F150 2015 model for the first time as a standard feature rather than an option. Formerly, only the 2.7-liter turbocharged V-6 version came with stop-start, which requires a more robust (and expensive) absorbent-glass-mat (AGM) battery that can better handle the constant cycling and the heavier draw from vehicle accessories with the engine off.

General Motors

In 2008 General Motors released its Chevrolet Tahoe Hybrid  model with AHS2 2mode technology, which combines start-stop technology with regenerative braking and electric vehicle mode  in certain conditions under 29 mph.

In 2012 General Motors released its Chevrolet Malibu Eco model with eAssist technology, which combines start-stop technology with regenerative braking and electric boost in certain conditions.

In 2014 General Motors announced that the Chevrolet Impala and Malibu would have a (non-eAssist) start-stop system across all models.

Honda

Honda has been using the start-stop function for over a decade via their IMA mild hybrid system in first generation Insight models in the Japanese domestic market since 1999 and more recently on the Civic Hybrid.

Hyundai

While both the Kia Rio and Rio5 share the same new direct-injected four-cylinder 1.6 L engine with its cousin Hyundai Accent/Verna (also newly redesigned for 2012), Hyundai made no mention of this feature in their Accent line. Hyundai 1.4 manual has the ISG (Intelligent Stop & Go) system (in Israel).

Jaguar

Jaguar's Intelligent Eco Stop/Start was first fitted to the XF and XJ models in 2011 before expanding to the rest of the range.

Kia

The redesigned 2012 Kia Rio and Rio5 (hatchback) debuted at the 2011 New York Auto Show was announced with their Intelligent Stop and Go (ISG) feature, or stop-start technology.

Kia claims the combination of direct fuel injection and stop-start will offer 30 mpg for city driving and 40 mpg on the highway in both 6 speed manual and automatic transmissions.

Land Rover

In 2008 Land Rover fitted its Freelander with Stop/Start which could reduce fuel consumption and emissions by up to 10%. As of 2016 all Land Rover and Range Rover models are fitted with Intelligent Eco Stop/Start.

Mahindra & Mahindra

Mahindras were the first in India to launch stop-start based Micro Hybrid system in May 2000. This involved home-grown technology and first of its kind component development like Hall sensor based neutral and clutch pedal sensors, and later a joint venture with Bosch for common rail based vehicles.

Mazda

The i-Stop system, Mazda's first start stop system, detects which piston is in the best position to restart quickest, which is the one in the combustion stroke phase, where air and fuel are in the cylinder, ready to be ignited. The mixture in this cylinder is ignited by the spark plug, forcing that piston down, and with assistance from the starter motor, results in a near instantaneous engine restart time of 0.35 seconds.

In 2011, Mazda announced i-ELOOP, a system which uses a variable-voltage alternator to convert kinetic energy to electric power during deceleration. The energy stored in a double-layer capacitor, is used to supply power needed by vehicle electrical systems. When used in conjunction with Mazda's start-stop system, i-Stop, the company claims fuel savings of up to 10%.

Nissan
Nissan uses the S-Hybrid (stylized in all caps as "S-HYBRID") brand for their micro hybrid system. The S-Hybrid system is entirely contained within the engine compartment and does not require a traction battery. Vehicles with the S-Hybrid system are equipped with an Energy Control (ECO) motor, which serves as the gasoline engine's alternator and starter motor. These vehicles are also equipped with an additional "sub-battery" located in the engine compartment to power the vehicle's electric accessories when the gasoline engine has shut down, instead of using a constantly-driven alternator. When the driver lifts off the throttle or brakes, the ECO motor is driven as an alternator to maintain "sub-battery" charge. In addition to being used to restart the engine, the ECO motor also applies  of torque for one second to the crankshaft when driving away from a stop, providing a small amount of electric motor assist.

Opel/Vauxhall

In 2010, Opel introduced Start/stop in their EcoFLEX branded models. The system is used with Family 0, Ecotec and MGE petrol and MultiJet, Circle L, and Family B diesel engines.

Perodua

Perodua first introduced the start/stop system in 2016 which is called "Eco idle" in the Bezza. Initially, it was only limited to the range-topping Advance variant. Subsequently, newer models such as the Myvi, Aruz, Ativa, and Alza started to feature this system as standard, even on base models.

Renault

Renault introduced the technology in all of its European models in 2010.

Roewe

In 2009, Roewe's Rover 75 based 750 was fitted with stop-start as standard with the hybrid 1.8 Rover K-series engine.

SAAB
A Start/Stop function was fitted to the second-generation 9-5 in 2009.  The button to control the system was placed next to the gearshift like SAAB ignition keys of old.

Subaru
Many 2020 and 2021 Subaru vehicles have been equipped with auto stop/start function.

Suzuki

Some car makers such as Suzuki have one additional small 12V lithium-ion battery inside the car. The system is marketed as "SHVS Mild Hybrid System" (Smart Hybrid Vehicle by Suzuki) and available as an option in Ignis, Swift, Baleno in several markets.

Tata

Tata Motors introduced this system on their LCV Tata Ace.

Toyota
Toyota showed a prototype of its six-cylinder Toyota Crown equipped with an automatic on/off switch in 1974, claiming a 10-percent gas saving in traffic.

More recently, Toyota has been selling cars with start-stop system on their internal combustion engine vehicles since 2009, and since 1997 in their Prius hybrid line. Both Toyota and Mazda introduced stop-start technology, available also outside of Japan, in some of their 2009 model year vehicles.

Volkswagen

Volkswagen began using start-stop systems with the Polo Formel E with SSA around 1983, after having previewed the system on the 1981 Auto 2000 research car. Later the LUPO 3L, and after that in the Polo, Golf and Passat BlueMotion, which also include weight and aerodynamic improvements. The system is now commonplace in the Volkswagen range, fitted to all vehicles with the Bluemotion Technology package, though certain other models have the technology too. For the Lupo 3L, with an automated manual gearbox and clutch, the engine stops four seconds after the car becomes stationary with the driver's foot on the brake pedal. No other action is necessary. Removing the foot from the brake pedal initiates engine start and the car can be driven away. The gear lever remains in the drive D position throughout. The same applies to the Audi A2 1.2TDi, which is almost identical mechanically.

Volvo

Volvo introduced their Start/Stop technology in 2009 under their DRIVe branding.

Mitsubishi
Mitsubishi Motors introduced this system in 1999 under their AS&G (Auto Stop & Go) branding, on their kei-car Mitsubishi Pistachio. Mitsubishi has been marketing AS&G Technology in its ClearTec branded models in the European market since 2008. AS&G system is also available on Mitsubishi Colt (EU), which went on sale in Europe in 2008. Since 2010, this system is also used in the Mitsubishi ASX (EU). In 2015, AS&G was added to the Mitsubishi Eclipse Cross.

Concerns
Hybrid/electric assist vehicles experience almost no delay in power from a stop, due to the instant availability of power from the battery to the electric motor(s). Gasoline/microhybrids on the other hand generally experience slight delays (albeit fractions of a second).

In February 2001 the US National Highway Traffic Safety Administration (NHTSA) raised questions about non-hybrid Honda vehicles equipped with the company's 'Idle Stop' transmissions due to concerns over the "sudden lurching forward of a vehicle in an automatic restart" – rather than the "gradual creeping forward found in current transmission designs".

Many people think that long-term use may induce additional wear due to lack of oil lubrication. For the crankshaft bearing half shells and the big end bearings this can translate into frequent high-speed rotary movement before a hydrodynamic film is established. During this phase of boundary lubrication, metal-to-metal contact can occur between the crankshaft surface and the bearing's sliding surface. This was not an issue while the number of engine restarts totaled what was generally understood to be a normal magnitude. However, in a vehicle with a start-stop system this effect can necessitate new technological solutions to avoid premature bearing wear, depending on the driving cycle. Consequently, future engines for start-stop applications need to be designed for 250,000 to 300,000 starts. Traditional bearing shells with aluminum or copper lining show severe wear after only 100,000 cycles.

Some implementations do not use a starter motor, eliminating concerns of starter motor wear. The Mazda i-stop used in the Mazda3/Axela line (in Europe and JDM) uses combustion to assist the starter motor by sensing the position of the piston in the cylinder. They claim quieter and quicker engine restart within 0.35 seconds.

Some car makers such as Suzuki have one lithium-ion battery inside the car.

See also

 Idle reduction
 Microcar

References

Automotive technologies
Starting systems
Hybrid vehicles